The Type 143A Gepard class was a class of missile bearing fast attack craft and the last one in service with the German Navy before the remaining four operational ships were decommissioned on 16 November 2016. The Ghana Navy operates two such ships. 

The Gepard-class vessels were gradually supplemented by s and later replaced completely by them.

The ships in class were named after small to medium-sized predatory animals; Gepard is German for "cheetah".

List of ships

The "S" and the number are part of the ship's full name. When the ships were first commissioned, their designation included only the number; however, the crews petitioned for full names, and the decision was made to combine the original names with the additional animal name.

Since 1 July 2006, all ships had formed part of the 7. Schnellbootgeschwader (7th Fast Patrol Boat Squadron), whereas for the eight years prior the flotilla was split into (hulls S 76–S 80) 2. Schnellbootgeschwader (2nd Fast Patrol Boat Squadron), and (hulls S 71–S 75) 7. Schnellbootgeschwader. The squadron was stationed in Warnemünde, where both predecessor squadrons had been based.

Gallery

Notes

References

Patrol vessels of the German Navy
Missile boat classes